Insektenbörse was a German entomology magazine established in 1884. It was renamed Entomologisches Wochenblatt in 1907–1908 and renamed again Entomologische Rundschau in 1909–1939. Beginning with volume 26 the journal was published by Alfred Kernen Verlag, Stuttgart, Germany. Insekten-Börse was also issued at various times as a trade supplement to Entomologische Zeitschrift.

See also
 Carl Ribbe, "1900 Neue Lepidopteren aus Neu-Guinea" Insektenbörse 17 (39): 308, (42): 329-330, (44): 346

References

Walther Hermann Richard Horn and Sigmund Schenkling 1928–1929.Index Litteratuae Entomologicae Horn, Berlin-Dahlem.

General references
Biodiversity Heritage Library – Insektenbörse – issue date: January 1914.
More info Biodiversity Heritage Library. September 2010.

External links

Biodiversity Heritage Library digital versions of vol. 28 , 1911 and vol. 31, 1914. Bound version of the weekly trade magazine. Not the taxonomic journal but issued with it.
Academy of Natural Sciences Library

Defunct magazines published in Germany
Entomology journals and magazines
German-language magazines
Weekly magazines published in Germany
Magazines established in 1884
Magazines disestablished in 1939
Magazines published in Stuttgart
1884 establishments in Germany
1939 disestablishments in Germany